China Harayeko Manchhe is an autobiography written by Hari Bansha Acharya. The story features a god-fearing man who happens to lose his "China" or "Cheena" (horoscope).

Synopsis

The storyline of Cheena Harayako Manchhe, is about a simple, god-fearing man who happens to lose his "China" or "Cheena" (horoscope). The autobiography depicts the author's childhood memories, fantasies and the struggles he had to face during his adolescent years. “The book is the tribute to my late wife Meera and proceeds from the book will go to a trust of her name,” said the author at a press meet.

A polished and most celebrated comedian and film actor of Nepal, Acharya, during a launch ceremony of his book, wished he could be a god in his next life so that he in turn could transform the gods into human beings subject to pain, misery and suffering. He also made a confession that he had become an agnostic since all his efforts to save his wife, despite his devout worship of the gods, failed. “I wrote this book to heal my pain of losing her,” he further added.

Born 9 October 1958, to Homanjaya Acharya and Ganesh Kumari in Gairidharan, Kathmandu, Hari Bansha Acharya has two sons, Trilok and Mohit. Hari Bansha's name is inseparably linked with his comedian partner, Madan Krishna Shrestha, another celebrated comedian/actor of Nepal.

See also 

 Khusi
 Antarmanko Yatra
 Jiwan Kada Ki Phool
 Phoolko Aankhama

References

2013 non-fiction books
Nepalese biographies
Nepalese books
Nepali-language books